Scolecura is a genus of South American sheet weavers that was first described by Alfred Frank Millidge in 1991.

Species
 it contains four species, found in Argentina, Colombia, and Brazil:
Scolecura cambara Rodrigues, 2005 – Brazil
Scolecura cognata Millidge, 1991 (type) – Colombia
Scolecura parilis Millidge, 1991 – Brazil, Argentina
Scolecura propinqua Millidge, 1991 – Argentina

See also
 List of Linyphiidae species (Q–Z)

References

Araneomorphae genera
Linyphiidae
Spiders of South America